The Orlovka is a river of Bilibinsky District, Chukotka Autonomous Okrug, Russia. It is a right tributary of the Bolshoy Anyuy.

References

Rivers of Chukotka Autonomous Okrug